Tom Rozantz  is an American former professional gridiron football quarterback who played in the Canadian Football League (CFL) and the United States Football League (USFL). He played college football at William & Mary.

Early life and high school
Rozantz attended Fairview High School where he was a member of the baseball, basketball, football and wrestling teams. As a senior, he completed 140 of 266 passes for 2338 yards and was named All-County for a second straight season.

College career
Rozantz was a four year starter at quarterback for the William & Mary Indians. As a freshman in 1975, he helped lead the team to an upset win over Richmond. He was named All-Southern Conference in his sophomore season and was named an honorable mention All-American by the Associated Press as a junior and senior.

Professional career
Rozantz was signed by the New Orleans Saints as an undrafted free agent in 1979 but was cut during training camp. He was signed by the Saskatchewan Roughriders of the Canadian Football League (CFL) in 1980. He was traded to the Hamilton Tiger-Cats midway through the season. He was traded to the Toronto Argonauts shortly before the 1981 season and was released on September 8.

Rozantz was signed by the Chicago Blitz of the newly-formed United States Football League (USFL) in 1983. He was signed by the Pittsburgh Maulers in 1984. Rozantz was a member of the Birmingham Stallions in 1985 and spent the season as the team's third string quarterback.

References

External links
William & Mary Tribe Hall of Fame bio

Living people
Canadian football quarterbacks
American players of Canadian football
American football quarterbacks
William & Mary Tribe football players
Players of American football from Pennsylvania
Toronto Argonauts players
Saskatchewan Roughriders players
Chicago Blitz players
Pittsburgh Maulers players
Hamilton Tiger-Cats players
Birmingham Stallions players
Year of birth missing (living people)